Harold Lawrence "Hobb" Wilson (September 5, 1904 – October 11, 1977) was a Canadian ice hockey player.

Wilson was a member of the Saskatoon Quakers who represented Canada at the 1934 World Ice Hockey Championships held in Milan, Italy where they won Gold.

See also
List of Canadian national ice hockey team rosters

References

Canadian ice hockey defencemen
Saskatoon Quakers players
1904 births
1977 deaths